Warson Woods is a city in St. Louis County, Missouri, United States. The population was 1,962 at the 2010 census.

Geography
Warson Woods is located at  (38.607852, -90.390841).

Demographics

2010 census
As of the census of 2010, there were 1,962 people, 760 households, and 568 families living in the city. The racial makeup of the city was 97.9% White, 0.5% African American, 0.2% Native American, 0.7% Asian, 0.3% from other races, and 0.6% from two or more races. Hispanic or Latino of any race were 1.3% of the population.

There were 760 households, of which 33.6% had children under the age of 18 living with them, 68.7% were married couples living together, 4.5% had a female householder with no husband present, 1.6% had a male householder with no wife present, and 25.3% were non-families. 23.7% of all households were made up of individuals, and 14.6% had someone living alone who was 65 years of age or older. The average household size was 2.58 and the average family size was 3.07.

The median age in the city was 45.1 years. 27.2% of residents were under the age of 18; 3.5% were between the ages of 18 and 24; 19.2% were from 25 to 44; 28.9% were from 45 to 64; and 21.3% were 65 years of age or older. The gender makeup of the city was 48.4% male and 51.6% female.

2000 census
As of the census of 2000, there were 1,983 people, 781 households, and 614 families living in the city. The racial makeup of the city was 96.08% White, 2.50% African American, 1.16% Asian, and 0.25% from two or more races. Hispanic or Latino of any race were 0.55% of the population.

There were 781 households, out of which 31.0% had children under the age of 18 living with them, 72.6% were married couples living together, 4.4% had a female householder with no husband present, and 21.3% were non-families. 19.7% of all households were made up of individuals, and 14.0% had someone living alone who was 65 years of age or older. The average household size was 2.54 and the average family size was 2.93.

In the city, the population was spread out, with 25.3% under the age of 18, 3.0% from 18 to 24, 20.6% from 25 to 44, 23.1% from 45 to 64, and 28.0% who were 65 years of age or older. The median age was 46 years. For every 100 females, there were 95.9 males. For every 100 females age 18 and over, there were 91.5 males.

The median income for a household in the city was $87,330, and the median income for a family was $97,147. Males had a median income of $78,684 versus $40,313 for females. The per capita income for the city was $46,575. About 1.6% of families and 2.7% of the population were below the poverty line, including 4.1% of those under age 18 and 2.8% of those age 65 or over.

References

External links

Cities in St. Louis County, Missouri
Cities in Missouri